Cerrosafe is a fusible alloy with a low melting point. It is useful for making reference castings whose dimensions can be correlated to those of the mold or other template due to its well-known thermal expansion properties during cooling. The alloy contracts during the first 30 minutes, allowing easy removal from a mold, then expands during the next 30 minutes to return to the exact original size. It then continues expanding at a known rate for 200 hours, allowing conversion of measurements of the casting back to those of the mold.

Similar metals

References

External links 
 Examples of chamber casts using low-temp metal

Fusible alloys
Bismuth compounds
Cadmium
Lead alloys
Tin alloys